is a 2014 Japanese erotic drama film directed by Hajime Hashimoto, starring Maiko Amano, Noriko Hamada and Rina Sakuragi and part of a film series based on the novels of Oniroku Dan. It was released on 17 May 2014.

Plot
The film is set in Tokyo.

Cast
Maiko Amano as Misaki Amamiya
Noriko Hamada as Shizuko Toyama  
Rina Sakuragi as Ruri
Yuichi Kimura as Yoshihiko Baba   
Kanji Tsuda as Toyama
Naoki Kawano as Hiroki
Hideo Sakaki as Saito
Yuki Tsujimoto as Eddie   
Anri as Mifuyu
Daikichi Sugawara as Kurokawa

Reception
On Film Business Asia, Derek Elley gave the film a rating of 5 out of 10.

References

External links

2010s erotic drama films
Japanese erotic drama films
Films directed by Hajime Hashimoto
Films set in Tokyo
Toei Company films
2014 drama films
2010s Japanese films